Gladys Emma Peto (1890–1977) was an English artist, fashion designer, illustrator and writer of children's books.

Early life and education
Peto was born in Cookham, the only daughter of William Peto and Mary Jane Reeves of Cannon Court, Maidenhead.

She attended Maidenhead High School, then Harvington College in Ealing. She later went on to study at the Maidenhead School of Arts in 1908, and London's School of Art in 1911. She undertook a design course at the John Hassall Correspondence school in 1918.

Career

Peto created drawings for "The letters of Phrynette" in The Sketch. This was similar to the series "Letters of Eve" in The Tatler. The latter was illustrated by Annie Fish and there was a court case.

Her family was not especially artistic. As a girl in Maidenhead, she would go out "in her father's trap" and notice interesting people along the way. She would get home and sketch them.

She moved with her husband, who had retired from the Army, to Northern Ireland in 1939 and retired from commercial art in 1946. She devoted her remaining years to painting landscapes in watercolors and to drawing and cultivating flowers. She suffered a stroke in 1970 that paralyzed her right, and dominant, hand, but continued to draw, paint and write with her left hand.

In the 1930s, it was the "in" thing to wear a Peto dress. Peto's advertising illustrations for Allen and Hanbury's infant formula, Ovaltine and many other products were featured in magazines and posters.

In 1922, she married Dr Cuthbert Lindsay Emmerson of the Royal Army Medical Corps, and  she traveled with him to Malta, Cyprus and Egypt. He retired in 1946 as a Colonel and died in 1977.

References

1890 births
1977 deaths
English children's writers
English fashion designers
British women fashion designers
People from Maidenhead
Date of birth missing
Date of death missing
20th-century English businesspeople